The 2004 Wimbledon Championships was a tennis tournament played on grass courts at the All England Lawn Tennis and Croquet Club in Wimbledon, London in the United Kingdom. It was the 118th edition of the Wimbledon Championships and were held from 21 June to 4 July 2004. It was the third Grand Slam tennis event of the year.

Roger Federer was successful in his title defence, defeating Andy Roddick in the final to win his second Wimbledon title. Two-time defending champion Serena Williams was unsuccessful in her title defence, being upset in the final by then little-known 17-year-old Russian Maria Sharapova; Sharapova became the first Russian player, male or female, to win Wimbledon, the second-youngest player to win Wimbledon in the Modern Era and third-youngest overall.

In the juniors, Gaël Monfils won his third consecutive Grand Slam title in the boys' competition, and Kateryna Bondarenko won the girls' title.

Point and prize money distribution

Point distribution
Below are the tables with the point distribution for each discipline of the tournament.

Senior points

Prize distribution
The total prize money for 2004 championships was £9,707,280. The winner of the men's title earned £602,500 while the women's singles champion earned £560,500.

* per team

Champions

Seniors

Men's singles

 Roger Federer defeated  Andy Roddick, 4–6, 7–5, 7–6(7–3), 6–4 
It was Federer's sixth title of the year, and his 17th overall. It was his third career Grand Slam title, and his 2nd at Wimbledon.

Women's singles

 Maria Sharapova defeated  Serena Williams, 6–1, 6–4 
It was Sharapova's second title of the year, and her fourth overall. It was her first career Grand Slam title.

Men's doubles

 Jonas Björkman /  Todd Woodbridge defeated  Julian Knowle /  Nenad Zimonjić, 6–1, 6–4, 4–6, 6–4

Women's doubles

 Cara Black /  Rennae Stubbs defeated  Liezel Huber /  Ai Sugiyama, 6–3, 7–6(7-5)

Mixed doubles

 Wayne Black /  Cara Black defeated  Todd Woodbridge /  Alicia Molik, 3–6, 7–6(10-8), 6–4

Juniors

Boys' singles

 Gaël Monfils defeated  Miles Kasiri, 7–5, 7–6(8-6)

Girls' singles

 Kateryna Bondarenko defeated  Ana Ivanovic, 6–4, 6–7(2-7), 6–3

Boys' doubles

 Brendan Evans /  Scott Oudsema defeated  Robin Haase /  Viktor Troicki, 6–4, 6–4

Girls' doubles

 Victoria Azarenka /  Olga Govortsova defeated  Marina Erakovic /  Monica Niculescu, 6–4, 3–6, 6–4

Singles seeds

Men's singles
  Roger Federer (champion)
  Andy Roddick (final, lost to Roger Federer)
  Guillermo Coria (second round, lost to Florian Mayer)
  David Nalbandian (withdrew)
  Tim Henman (quarterfinals, lost to Mario Ančić)
  Juan Carlos Ferrero (third round, lost to Robby Ginepri)
  Lleyton Hewitt (quarterfinals, lost to Roger Federer)
  Rainer Schüttler (third round, lost to Vince Spadea)
  Carlos Moyá (fourth round, lost to Lleyton Hewitt)
  Sébastien Grosjean (semifinals, lost to Roger Federer)
  Mark Philippoussis (fourth round, lost to Tim Henman)
  Sjeng Schalken (quarterfinals, lost to Andy Roddick)
  Paradorn Srichaphan (first round, lost to Ivo Karlović)
  Mardy Fish (second round, lost to Joachim Johansson)
  Nicolás Massú (first round, lost to Alexander Popp)
  Jiří Novák (first round, lost to Xavier Malisse)
  Jonas Björkman (third round, lost to Joachim Johansson)
  Feliciano López (third round, lost to Ivo Karlović)
  Marat Safin (first round, lost to Dmitry Tursunov)
  Tommy Robredo (second round, lost to Karol Beck)
  Juan Ignacio Chela (second round, lost to Thomas Enqvist)
  Andrei Pavel (second round, lost to Kenneth Carlsen)
  Max Mirnyi (first round, lost to Jan-Michael Gambill)
  Fernando González (third round, lost to Mark Philippoussis)
  Dominik Hrbatý (third round, lost to Mario Ančić)
  Taylor Dent (third round, lost to Andy Roddick)
  Robby Ginepri (fourth round, lost to Sébastien Grosjean)
  Ivan Ljubičić (first round, lost to Wayne Ferreira)
  Nicolas Kiefer (first round, lost to Thomas Johansson)
  Vince Spadea (fourth round, lost to Sjeng Schalken)
  Mikhail Youzhny (first round, lost to Goran Ivanišević)
  Hicham Arazi (third round, lost to Tim Henman)
  Luis Horna (first round, lost to Mario Ančić)

Women's singles
  Serena Williams (final, lost to Maria Sharapova)
  Anastasia Myskina (third round, lost to Amy Frazier)
  Venus Williams (second round, lost to Karolina Šprem)
  Amélie Mauresmo (semifinals, lost to Serena Williams)
  Lindsay Davenport (semifinals, lost to Maria Sharapova)
  Elena Dementieva (first round, lost to Sandra Kleinová)
  Jennifer Capriati (quarterfinals, lost to Serena Williams)
  Svetlana Kuznetsova (first round, lost to Virginie Razzano)
  Paola Suárez (quarterfinals, lost to Amélie Mauresmo)
  Nadia Petrova (fourth round, lost to Jennifer Capriati)
  Ai Sugiyama (quarterfinals, lost to Maria Sharapova)
  Vera Zvonareva (fourth round, lost to Lindsay Davenport)
  Maria Sharapova (champion)
  Silvia Farina Elia (fourth round, lost to Amélie Mauresmo)
  Patty Schnyder (second round, lost to Emmanuelle Gagliardi)
  Anna Smashnova-Pistolesi (first round, lost to Katarina Srebotnik)
  Chanda Rubin (first round, lost to Marion Bartoli)
  Francesca Schiavone (second round, lost to Tatiana Golovin)
  Fabiola Zuluaga (first round, lost to Anne Kremer)
  Elena Bovina (second round, lost to Daniela Hantuchová)
  Magdalena Maleeva (fourth round, lost to Karolina Šprem)
  Conchita Martínez (first round, lost to Milagros Sequera)
  Jelena Dokić (first round, lost to Gisela Dulko)
  Mary Pierce (first round, lost to Virginia Ruano Pascual)
  Nathalie Dechy (third round, lost to Jennifer Capriati)
  Lisa Raymond (second round, lost to Ľudmila Cervanová)
  Alicia Molik (third round, lost to Tamarine Tanasugarn)
  Émilie Loit (first round, lost to Tatiana Panova)
  Dinara Safina (first round, lost to Arantxa Parra Santonja)
  Eleni Daniilidou (first round, lost to Magüi Serna)
  Amy Frazier (fourth round, lost to Maria Sharapova)
  Meghann Shaughnessy (third round, lost to Karolina Šprem)

Main draw wild card entries
The following players received wild cards into the main draw senior events.

Men's singles
  Richard Bloomfield
  Alex Bogdanovic
  Lee Childs
  Mark Hilton
  Goran Ivanišević
  Jonathan Marray
  Arvind Parmar
  Greg Rusedski

Women's singles
  Elena Baltacha
  Amanda Janes
  Anne Keothavong
  Martina Navratilova
  Katie O'Brien
  Jane O'Donoghue
  Patty Schnyder
  Emily Webley-Smith

Men's doubles
  James Auckland /  Lee Childs
  Andrew Banks /  Alex Bogdanovic
  Jamie Delgado /  Arvind Parmar
  Ian Flanagan /  Martin Lee
  Mark Hilton /  Jonathan Marray
  Dan Kiernan /  David Sherwood

Women's doubles
  Elena Baltacha /  Amanda Janes
  Sarah Borwell /  Emily Webley-Smith
  Hannah Collin /  Anne Keothavong
  Helen Crook /  Anna Hawkins
  Tatiana Golovin /  Mary Pierce
  Anabel Medina Garrigues /  Arantxa Sánchez Vicario

Mixed doubles
  Jonathan Marray /  Amanda Janes
  Jared Palmer /  Arantxa Sánchez Vicario
  Arvind Parmar /  Jane O'Donoghue
  Andy Ram /  Anastasia Rodionova
  David Sherwood /  Anne Keothavong

Protected ranking

Men's singles
 Tommy Haas
 Thomas Johansson
 Kristian Pless
 Bohdan Ulihrach

Women's singles
 Anne Kremer

Qualifier entries

Men's singles

 Jamie Delgado
 André Sá
 Iván Navarro
 Richard Gasquet
 Ramón Delgado
 Glenn Weiner
 Jan Hernych
 Christophe Rochus
 Alejandro Falla
 Ivo Heuberger
 Daniele Bracciali
 Wang Yeu-tzuoo
 Olivier Patience
 Julian Knowle
 Andy Ram
 Janko Tipsarević

The following players received entry into the lucky loser spot:
 Julien Benneteau
 Davide Sanguinetti
 Alexander Peya
 Potito Starace
 Stefano Pescosolido

Women's singles

 Nuria Llagostera Vives
 Angelique Widjaja
 Tatiana Panova
 Sun Tiantian
 Mashona Washington
 Eva Birnerová
 Virginie Razzano
 Jennifer Hopkins
 Stéphanie Foretz
 Yuliya Beygelzimer
 Edina Gallovits
 Christina Wheeler

Men's doubles

 Stephen Huss /  Robert Lindstedt
 Gergely Kisgyörgy /  Łukasz Kubot
 Rik de Voest /  Nathan Healey
 Daniele Bracciali /  Giorgio Galimberti

The following teams received entry into the lucky loser spot:
 Devin Bowen /  Tripp Phillips
 Diego Ayala /  Brian Vahaly
 Kenneth Carlsen /  Tuomas Ketola

Women's doubles

 Leanne Baker /  Nicole Sewell
 Jeon Mi-ra /  Yuka Yoshida
 Lubomira Bacheva /  Eva Birnerová
 Evie Dominikovic /  Anastasia Rodionova

The following teams received entry into the lucky loser spot:
 Barbara Schwartz /  Jasmin Wöhr
 Amanda Augustus /  Natalie Grandin
 Claire Curran /  Jane O'Donoghue

References

External links
 Official Wimbledon Championships website

 
Wimbledon Championships
Wimbledon Championships
Wimbledon Championships
Wimbledon Championships